C/2021 A1 (Leonard) was a long period comet that was discovered by G. J. Leonard at the Mount Lemmon Observatory on 3 January 2021 (a year before perihelion) when the comet was  from the Sun. It had a retrograde orbit. It came within  of Venus, the closest-known cometary approach to Venus.

Observational history 
The comet appeared to have a 10" coma and a 5" broad tail in the photographs taken as part of the Mt. Lemmon Survey and its magnitude was estimated to be 19.0. Precovery images dated back to April 11, 2020.

On 10 October the comet showed a short but dense dust tail. In late November the comet appeared to stop brightening as expected and to fade instead, indicating a possible disintergration of the nucleus. In early December the comet had an apparent magnitude (coma+nucleus) of around 6. The first reports of naked-eye observations by experienced observers started coming in on 5 December 2021. Much like observing Messier 33, the low surface brightness of the comet can make it difficult to observe near urban areas. On 3 December 2021 many emission lines of NH2, C2, and [OI] were detected in the spectrum of the comet in the wavelength range between 5000 and 7000 Å.    On the morning of 6 December 2021 the comet was about 5 degrees from the star Arcturus. On 14 December 2021 the comet was 14.7 degrees from the Sun and quickly became better seen from the southern hemisphere. 

The forward scattering of light helped the comet to briefly brighten to as much as magnitude 2.5, but was also enhanced by a modest outburst. The comet experienced outbursts on December 15, 20 and 23, thus reaching third magnitude before dimming back to 4th magnitude. The ion tail of the comet appeared complex, with knots and steamers. The comet's discoverer called the tails "some of the best ever observed". In stacked photos the tail could be traced for 60 degrees in the sky. While the comet was lower in the sky, atmospheric extinction offset much of the brightening. As of 22 December 2021, the comet was around apparent magnitude 4, making it a good binocular comet for the Southern hemisphere. It was the brightest comet of 2021. One more outburst took place after perihelion, on 6-8 January 2022, when the comet brightened by 1.5 magnitudes.

On 23 February 2022 the comet was observed with the SLOOH telescope in Chile, operated by Martin Masek. The comet lacked a central concetration, which indicates that the nucleus of the comet disintegrated or evaporated completely. Further observations confirmed the lack of concetration. In April 2022, the disintegrating comet was observed using the Hubble Space Telescope, with further observations planned for June 2022. No survining fragments were found by the Hubble Space Telescope, while the Swan Hill observatory imaged an extensive debris cloud. The disintergration of the comet probably started in mid December 2021.

Orbit 

C/2021 A1 has been inside of the orbit of Neptune since May 2009. Using an epoch of 1950 which is well before the comet entered the planetary region of the Solar System, a barycentric orbit solution suggests the comet had an approximately 80,000-year orbital period. Thus, the comet has spent the last 40,000 years inbound from approximately  (0.06 light year). After perihelion, the comet will be ejected from the Solar System. The barycentric orbit will remain hyperbolic after September 2022.

It made its closest approach to the Sun on 3 January 2022.

Gallery

See also 
C/2011 L4

References 
 

20210103
Comets in 2021
Hyperbolic comets
Destroyed comets